Arisaema section Flagellarisaema is a section of the genus Arisaema.

Description
Plants in this section have subterranean stem with up to three or more pedate leaves. Flowers have a long spadix.

Distribution
Plants from this section are disjunctively distributed in eastern Asia from China through Japan and Korea, and eastern North America from Canada through Mexico.

Species
Arisaema section Flagellarisaema comprises the following species:

References

Plant sections